Varlaam was Metropolitan of Moscow and All Rus' from 1511 to 1521. He was the seventh Metropolitan in Moscow to be appointed  without the approval of the Ecumenical Patriarch of Constantinople as had been the norm. 

From 1506 he was archimandrite of the Simonov Monastery in Moscow. He was selected by Grand Prince Vasily III on July 27, 1511 and consecrated Metropolitan on August 3, 1511.  He was said to be austere, never sycophantic to the grand prince, and never one to do anything against his own conscience.  He was of the Non-possessors, those who opposed ecclesiastical land-ownership, although that group had been defeated at earlier church councils.  He also protected Maximus the Greek, who was brought to Moscow to translate Greek texts.

In 1515, Varlaam consecrated the main church of the Khutyn Monastery just outside Novgorod the Great (the archiepiscopal see being vacant from 1509).  That same year, he consecrated the Tikhvin Monastery, also in the Novgorodian Eparchy.

Vasily III wished to divorce his wife and remarry. The metropolitan opposed his wishes. As a result, the Grand Prince deposed Varlaam was removed from office on December 17, 1521. He was confined in shackles in the Kyrilo-Beloozersky Monastery north of Moscow. He was later moved to the Spaso-Kamenyi Monastery in Vologda where he died sometime in 1522.

References

Metropolitans of Kiev and all Rus' (Patriarchate of Moscow)
1522 deaths
Year of birth unknown